The Royal Physiographic Society in Lund, is one of the Royal Academies in Sweden. It was founded in Lund, on December 2, 1772, and received a Royal Charter by Gustav III, on March 6, 1778.

See also
Lund University

References

External links 
Official website

Physiographic
Lund
1772 in Sweden